Green Alternative Freiburg, GAF for short, is the name of a local political party in Freiburg im Breisgau that split off from the Greens in the City Council in 2008. The city councilors Monika Stein and Coinneach McCabe had already been displeased for quite some time with the policy of the greens which they consider to be somewhat undemocratic when they finally took the decision to leave that party and to found the new political group somewhat further to the left. The Greens filed a complaint against the use of the new name which was rejected by the local court on July 7, 2012. The appeal against this decision was rejected by the Higher Regional Court on December 18, 2013. Coinneach McCabe, the Scottish top candidate of the Green Alternative Freiburg, was born in Glasgow in 1974 and has been living in Freiburg since 1999.

References

External links
Official website 

2008 establishments in Germany
Freiburg im Breisgau
Green political parties in Germany
Political parties established in 2008
Politics of Baden-Württemberg
Regional parties in Germany